Les Estables is a commune in the Haute-Loire department in south-central France.

History
A young geometer, who was doing survey work in the area for the Cassini maps, the first modern maps of France, was hacked to death by suspicious villagers in the 1740s.

Population

See also
 Communes of the Haute-Loire department

References

Communes of Haute-Loire